Jasna Góra (meaning "bright hill") may refer to the following places in Poland:
Jasna Góra Monastery, an important pilgrimage site in Częstochowa
Jasna Góra, Lower Silesian Voivodeship (south-west Poland)
Jasna Góra, Łódź Voivodeship (central Poland)